Two-time defending champions Jiske Griffioen and Esther Vergeer defeated Korie Homan and Sharon Walraven in the final, 6–3, 6–1 to win the women's doubles wheelchair tennis title at the 2008 Australian Open.

Seeds

  Jiske Griffioen /  Esther Vergeer (champions)
  Korie Homan /  Sharon Walraven (final)

Draw

Finals

Wheelchair Women's Doubles
2008 Women's Doubles